Ali Fitzgerald Moore (born February 25, 1978), better known by his stage name Big Ali and formerly Breakingz and Grimer, is an American singer, rapper, songwriter and DJ born in New York. He has been based in Paris, France, since 2001. He is signed to Up Music, a Warner Music label.

Career 

Big Ali released his debut album Louder in May 2009 on the record label. The album featured a great number of French and international producers and artists. "Hit the Floor" taken from the album became his first big single in October 2008 followed by "Neon Music" released in March 2009. A third single "Universal Party" followed in November 2009.

In collaborations, the joint 2006 single "Rock This Party (Everybody Dance Now)" by Bob Sinclar and Cutee-B featuring Dollarman, Ali & Makedah stayed at #1 for four weeks on the Ultratop 40 Belgian charts. In 2007, it became a number one hit in Billboards Hot Dance Club Songs.

Big Ali wrote his first lyrics at the age of 8. He created a crew of DJs called "World Famous Vynil Squad". He also had radio and TV collaborations such radio show "Full Throttle" with national US emissions in led by his friend Fatman Scoop and is creator of the show Jumpoff hosted by Ed Lover and Doctor Dré. He hosted his own show "The Magic Hour" at the Vassar College in New York.

Big Ali has also worked in club venues in the United States, Asia, Latin America and Europe and is very famous in France. He participated as an MC at the Cannes Film Festival, and is at the Saint Tropez VIP Room every year. He has worked with many successful French artists such as Kool Shen, Amine, Jean-Roch, Kore & Scalp, Leslie, Magic System, Bob Sinclar with Rohff on the hit "Dirty Hous", Sinik and more recently Maude Harcheb on her smash hit "Donne-Moi Le La" and others. Big Ali hosts one Saturday per month the show "Show Time" on Radio NRJ.

Discography

Albums

Solo singles

Charting

Featuring

Charting

Others 
 2006: Midas Touch (with Matt Houston ) on the album Phoenix 2006
 2007: "Dirty House" Rohff with Big Ali) in the album La Résurrection (Banlieue South remix)
 2008: "Stronger"  / "Plus fort"  (with Anggun) from her album Elevation
 2008: "Habibi" (with Leslie and Amar)
 2008: "Bienvenue chez les Bylkas" (with Sinik, Cheb Bilal)
 2009: "No Stress" (with Laurent Wolf et DJ Snake)
 2009: "New New New" (with Bob Sinclar) (Big Ali appears only in the music video for the song)
 2009: "Groove On" (remix) (with Timati and Snoop Dogg)
 2010: "Des larmes de sang" (with Florent Pagny)
 2010: "Calypso" (DJ Snake feat. Big Ali)
 2010: "Playground" (with DJ Assad and Willy William)
 2010: "Make Some Noise" (with Claude N'Joya and Richard Bahericz)
 2010: "Ciao Amore" (with Dara Bubamara)
 2012: "Le Dernier Jour" (the last day) (with PZK)
 2013: "Džoni Džoni" (with Dara Bubamara)
 2017: "Segui Me" (with Master Sina and Cheb Khalass)

References

External links 
Big Ali Myspace
Big Ali Twitter page

African-American DJs
20th-century African-American people
African-American songwriters
African-American male rappers
Living people
People from Queens, New York
Rappers from New York City
American expatriates in France
French people of African-American descent
Songwriters from New York (state)
21st-century American rappers
1978 births
21st-century American male musicians
21st-century African-American musicians
American male songwriters